The Northern Collegiate Hockey League (NCHL) is a college ice hockey league based in the central region of the United States. The conference is part of the American Collegiate Hockey Association Division 2 and is made up of eleven teams from universities and colleges based in Illinois, Michigan, and Wisconsin.

History 

The 2014-2015 season was the inaugural season for the NCHL, formed of ACHA D2 teams from Wisconsin, Iowa, Illinois, Minnesota, and Michigan.

Regular-season format 
Each conference member is required to play all the other members, for a 16 game conference season. Teams earn two point for a win (regulation or overtime), one point for a tie or an overtime loss, and zero points for a regulation loss. 

At the end of the season the top six teams qualify for the conference tournament, with the top two teams receiving a first round bye.

Member teams

Conference tournament format

Playoffs 2023

Playoffs 2022

Black Division

Orange Division

Playoffs 2020

Playoffs 2019

Playoffs 2018

Playoffs 2017

Playoffs 2016

Playoffs 2015

Conference champions (Hap Cup) 

Championship totals

Season awards

National championship qualifiers 
Concordia University WI (2023)
Marian University (2019)
Aurora University (2018)

Expansion member for 2023-24 season 
Milwaukee School of Engineering

Previous members 
 University of Minnesota Duluth (2014-16)
 Michigan Tech University (2014-16)
 Waldorf University (2014-17)
 St. Mary's University of MN (2014-18)
 St. Norbert College (2021-23)
 Purdue University Northwest (2021-22)

References 

ACHA Division 2 conferences
2014 establishments in the United States
College ice hockey conferences in the United States
Organizations established in 2014